The 2014–15 George Mason Patriots women's basketball team represented George Mason University during the 2014–2015 College Basketball season. Nyla Milleson resumes the responsibility as head coach for a second consecutive season. The George Mason Patriots are members of the Atlantic 10 Conference and play their home games at the Patriot Center. This is their second season playing in the Atlantic 10 Conference after becoming new members of the conference last season. They finished the season 13–17, 5–11 in A-10 play to finish in a four way tie for tenth place. They lost in the second round of the A-10 women's tournament to Saint Joseph's.

2014–2015 Media and televised games

George Mason Patriots Sports Network
Patriots games will be broadcast on WGMU Radio and streamed online through Patriot Vision . Most home games will also be featured on the A-10 Digital Network. Select games will be televised.

Televised games
George Mason has 2 conference games televised. One game on NBC Sports Network against the St. Louis Billikens with the result of George Mason winning 66-57 on 1/4/15 at the Patriot Center for their first conference win of the season. Another game on ESPNU on 1/18/15 against Richmond Spiders women's basketball with the result of George Mason losing 49-77 at the Robins Center.

Buzzer Beaters
Taylor Brown hits two buzzer beaters in two straight games. One against La Salle University to win 73-71. Another one against St. Bonaventure University to tie the game 53-53 to force overtime. The Patriots would go on to win 68-53. The buzzer beater against La Salle University was a euro-step layup when the game was tied 71-71. The other buzzer beater against St. Bonaventure University was a fade-away 3-pointer which went in all-net. The Patriots were down 53-50 with 7.5 seconds The video showed Taylor Brown being pushed to out of bounds while in shooting motion. St. Bonaventure University had a foul to give but let Taylor Brown tie the game, force the game into overtime, and let the Patriots win 68-55. Taylor Brown received attention from ABC 7 News after hitting the two buzzer beaters.

Roster

Schedule

|-
!colspan=9 style="background:#006400; color:#FFD700;"| Exhibition

|-
!colspan=9 style="background:#FFD700; color:#006400;"| Regular Season

|-
!colspan=9 style="background:#006400; color:#FFD700;"| Atlantic 10 Tournament

Rankings
2014–15 NCAA Division I women's basketball rankings

See also
 2014–15 George Mason Patriots men's basketball team
 George Mason Patriots women's basketball

References

George Mason Patriots women's basketball seasons
George Mason
George Mason Patriots women's basketball